Bishop Mykola Petro Luchok, O.P. (born 26 March 1974) is a Ukrainian prelate of the Latin Church of the Catholic Church and the Titular Bishop of Giru Marcelli and Auxiliary Bishop of Diocese of Mukachevo since 11 November 2019. Since 28 January 2022 he is also serving as Apostolic Administrator of the same Diocese.

Life
Bishop Luchok was born in the family of Oleksandr Luchok in Zakarpattia Oblast. After graduation of the school education, joined the Dominican Order in 1994; he made a profession on August 29, 1995, and a solemn profession on April 30, 2000, and was ordained as priest on June 23, 2003, after completed studies at the Major Dominican Theological Seminary in Kraków, Poland and the Pontifical University of John Paul II in Kraków, Poland.

He returned to Ukraine in 2003 and began to work in the Dominican parishes and as superior of the different local Dominican communities, aspecially in Yalta, Saint Petersburg (Russian Federation), Chortkiv, Lviv and Khmelnytskyi. From 2018 until 2019 he again served as superior of the Dominican community in Lviv.

On November 11, 2019, he was appointed by the Pope Francis as the first Auxiliary Bishop of the Diocese of Mukachevo, Ukraine and Titular Bishop of Giru Marcelli and consecrated in the Cathedral of St Martin of Tours in Mukachevo on December 10, 2019.

On Friday, January 28, 2022, Pope Francis accepted the resignation of His Eminence Antal Mainek, Bishop of the Diocese of Mukachevo of the Roman Catholic Church in Ukraine.  The Holy Father appointed the Auxiliary Bishop of the Mukachevo Diocese, His Eminence Mykola Luchko, O.P.

References

See also

1974 births
Living people
People from Mukachevo
Pontifical University of John Paul II alumni
Dominican bishops
Ukrainian people of Hungarian descent
21st-century Roman Catholic bishops in Ukraine
Bishops appointed by Pope Francis